The Women's Europe Competition was a sailing event on the program at the 1996 Summer Olympics that was held from 22 July to 2 August 1996 in Savannah, Georgia, United States. Points were awarded for placement in each race. Eleven races were scheduled and sailed. Each sailor had two discards.

Results

Daily standings

Conditions at the Europe course area's

Notes

References 
 
 
 

 
 

Europe
Europe (dinghy) competitions
Sail
Oly